Personal infrastructure is the fundamental tools, services and systems serving an individual that are necessary for that individual's function.
For example, if a person has built up a great personal infrastructure, say, having a cell phone, he/she would be able to make long-distance calls. A person that has learned how to drive and has a driver license would be able to use this to travel more effectively to work.   
  
Some aspects of personal infrastructure can take years to build up, such as education, programming skills and management skills. On the other hand, some aspects of personal infrastructure will take a comparatively shorter amount of time. For example, a cell phone can be bought quickly.   
    
To a certain extent, a home is also an aspect of personal infrastructure. Homeless people cannot perform many daily functions due to lack of a strong and solid personal infrastructure. For example, a home with a washing machine would be easier than a home that has no washing machine. But both are easier than the tasks a homeless person faces.

References

Distribution of wealth
Personal development